Konarzewo-Reczki  is a village in the administrative district of Gmina Gołymin-Ośrodek, within Ciechanów County, Masovian Voivodeship, in east-central Poland.

The village has a population of 20.

References

Konarzewo-Reczki